Karl Haglund (24 September 1890 – 5 November 1971) was a Swedish track and field athlete, who competed in the 1912 Summer Olympics. In 1912, he was eliminated in the first round of the 800 metres competition.

References

External links
Profile

1890 births
1971 deaths
Swedish male middle-distance runners
Olympic athletes of Sweden
Athletes (track and field) at the 1912 Summer Olympics